The Ohio News Network (ONN) – also referred to off-air as ONN Radio – is a radio news service in the U.S. state of Ohio. Based at Columbus, Ohio radio station WBNS-FM and owned by Dispatch Broadcast Group (which was purchased by Tegna Inc. in 2019), It provides statewide newscasts and sportscasts for more than 90 affiliate stations throughout the day, in addition to some seasonal long-form programming.

ONN had its origins as a cable news channel of the same name, which operated from 1996 to 2012 in more than 1.8 million households statewide.  Its studios and offices were co-located with sister station WBNS-TV, the CBS television affiliate for Columbus and central Ohio.  On July 25, 2012, ONN television announced it would be ceasing operations due to changing consumer habits, effective August 31, while ONN Radio would remain in service. ONN closed at 12:00 with the last programming being a farewell looking at the history of ONN.

Awards
ONN is regularly awarded for its outstanding news and programs regionally and nationally. In 2009, ONN received nine awards in the Ohio Associated Press contest including: Outstanding Sports Operation; Best Regularly Scheduled Sports; and Best Anchor Mike Kallmeyer. ONN was the runner-up for Outstanding News Operation in Ohio.
In 2008, ONN was presented the Emmy Award for Station Excellence in local programming to station managers Tom Griesdorn and Jason Pheister.

Former Television Channel Programming

News programming
With the slogan "Ohio's Channel", ONN features news relevant to the state.  Daily newscasts include:  Ohio This Morning, Ohio Today, Ohio Tonight, Ohio's 9 O'clock News, and Primetime Ohio.  Regular segments include sports, weather, business, environmental, political, and health.  A special in-depth report on a topic of statewide interest is featured each Thursday night during Ohio's 9 o'clock news.  ONN's "Weather on the 10's" is a statewide weather update every 10 minutes.

Capital Square is the longest running political television program in Ohio.  The show offers discussion of government in Ohio and Washington, D.C.  Capitol Square regularly features the top newsmakers, who are questioned by moderator Jim Heath. Capital Square was once a Sunday fixture for WBNS-TV in the 1990s until it moved to ONN.

ONN also includes election updates throughout the state on major election days or for emergency voting that affects a large portion of the state.

Non-news programming
ONN and Ohio State University co-sponsor Ohio Means Business, a thirty-minute program showcasing companies and individuals in Ohio's business world. The program is hosted by ONN anchor Mike Kallmeyer.  A new episode airs every other week.

ONN aired weekly Discover Ohio shows that profile great getaways and destinations across Ohio. The show is hosted by Mykkia Cameron, a former news reporter. The show was nominated for an Emmy Award in 2008.

To target younger viewers, the network airs The Brain Game each Thursday evening which features high school students in a quiz bowl setting. The show is sponsored by Westfield Insurance, an Ohio company. Mike Kallmeyer is the host. The show was nominated for an Emmy Award in 2009.

Ohio and Company features businesses from across the state in a brief highlight segment. Chef Tami is a weekly cooking show that features the antics of regional celebrity chef Tami Cecil from her Woodhaven Farm in Johnstown, Ohio.

Sports programming
Major League Soccer Columbus Crew matches were telecast on ONN from 2005-2011. Dwight Burgess was play-by-play commentator while Duncan Oughton was the most recent color commentator for all league matches. Katie Witham was the first sideline reporter, being replaced by Ashleigh Ignelzi when Katie's then-Cleveland Indians commitment took over. Beginning in 2010, select games were available in HDTV on Time Warner Cable in Columbus on HD Channel 1310 or 1311. Following the 2011 season, the Columbus Crew signed a deal with FOX Sports Ohio.

Many Ohio High School Athletic Association events, including hockey, football, and basketball were aired on ONN. ONN also aired weekly programming devoted to the Ohio State Buckeyes, Cincinnati Bearcats, and Miami Redhawks including live and tape delayed games.

ONN was one of the first TV networks to deliver live action sports video via Internet Protocol during the 2006-2007 school year for Miami Redhawks hockey. The team finished the 2008-2009 season at the Frozen Four with a 4-3 OT loss to Boston University in the championship.

Partnerships
ONN delivers the top statewide stories each day utilizing partnerships with news stations:  WBNS in Columbus, WKBN in Youngstown, WEWS in Cleveland, WHIO in Dayton, WKRC in Cincinnati, WTOV in Steubenville/Wheeling, WTVG in Toledo, and WLIO in Lima.  In addition, many ONN stories are seen daily on these stations.

ONN rebroadcasts local news programs during the afternoon in cooperation with its affiliates in other Ohio markets.  In addition to local news produced by Dispatch sister station WBNS, ONN aired local newscasts from WEWS in Cleveland, WKRC in Cincinnati and WTVG in Toledo on a slightly delayed basis.

ONN Radio
ONN Radio provides statewide newscasts and sportscasts for affiliate stations during the day, anchored by staffers from WBNS-FM. Long form programming includes the seasonal High School Football Tonight and College Football Today, both hosted by WBNS-FM's Skip Mosic.

ONN Radio is distributed by Radio Sound Network, which is also owned and operated by Tegna, Inc.  Radio Sound Network distributes various programming elements for radio stations, including live play-by-play broadcasts from the Columbus Blue Jackets Radio Network, the Ohio State Sports Network, and the Cleveland Cavaliers Radio Network.

Notable former on-air staff
 Marjorie Vincent – anchor
 John Fortney- anchor

Cable carriage
Three cable providers in the state of Ohio did not carry ONN at the time of ONN's closure: 
 Buckeye Cable System (Toledo)
 Massillon Cable TV, Inc.
 Comcast

References

External links
ONN Radio website, featuring on-demand audio
Dispatch Broadcast Group (old site)

Dispatch Broadcast Group
Mass media in Columbus, Ohio
24-hour television news channels in the United States
2012 disestablishments in Ohio
1996 establishments in Ohio